is a railway station located in the city of Izunokuni, Shizuoka Prefecture, Japan operated by the private railroad company Izuhakone Railway. It is located in the former town of Nirayama.

Lines
Nirayama Station is served by the Sunzu Line, and is located 9.8 kilometers from the starting point of the line at Mishima Station.

Station layout
The station has two opposed side platforms connected to the station building by a level crossing. Platform 2 is the primary platform, and is used for bidirectional traffic. Platform 1 is in occasional use only. The station building is unattended and has automatic ticket machines.

Platforms

History 
It was given its present name on May 25, 1919.

Passenger statistics
In fiscal 2017, the station was used by an average of 1466 passengers daily (boarding passengers only).

Surrounding area
 Nirayama Town Hall
 Nirayama High School
 Nirayama Castle ruins

See also
 List of Railway Stations in Japan

References

External links

 Official home page

Railway stations in Japan opened in 1900
Railway stations in Shizuoka Prefecture
Izuhakone Sunzu Line
Izunokuni